Eumachaeraea is a genus of tachinid flies in the family Tachinidae.

Species
Eumachaeraea auricephala Townsend, 1927

Distribution
Brazil.

References

Diptera of South America
Monotypic Brachycera genera
Exoristinae
Tachinidae genera
Taxa named by Charles Henry Tyler Townsend